Pattern is a temporary, site-specific public artwork by American artist Paula Schulze, located on the exterior of the former A.O. Smith office building near West Hopkins Street and North 27th Street in the city of Milwaukee, Wisconsin. The artwork, which consists of a series of curved, orange patterns painted on wood panels, was installed in September 2010. 

Pattern is located on the edge of a large industrial site that had been operated by A.O. Smith and Tower Automotive that is now under redevelopment. The brick building had been boarded up, and Schulze's design was mounted over the plywood covering the building's windows. Schulze is one of five Milwaukee artists commissioned by a nonprofit visual art presenter called IN:SITE to install temporary artworks at this location in cooperation with the 30th Street Industrial Corridor Corporation. Other participating artists are Marly Gisser, Sarah Luther, Colin Matthes, and Marla Sanvick. 

Schulze is primarily a printmaker. Pattern is her second temporary public art installation presented through IN:SITE.

References

Outdoor sculptures in Milwaukee
2010 sculptures
Wooden sculptures in Wisconsin